Eim HaBanim Semeicha  was written by Rabbi Yisachar Shlomo Teichtal, and published in 1943 in Budapest, Hungary. The title is taken from Psalms and means “A Joyous Mother of Children”.

The Book
Teichtal grew up as a staunch anti-Zionist Chasid of the Munkatsher Rebbe. However, during the Holocaust, Rabbi Teichtal changed his position from the one he espoused in his youth. The physical product of that introspection is the book, Eim HaBanim Semeicha, in which he specifically retracts his previous viewpoints, and argues that the true redemption can only come if the Jewish people unite and rebuild the land of Israel. Many of his coreligionists viewed the book with skepticism, some going so far as to ban Rabbi Teichtal from their synagogues.

In the book, Rabbi Teichtal strongly criticizes the Haredim for not supporting the settlement of the Land of Israel. When it was written, it was a scathing criticism of the Jewish Orthodox establishment, and Agudat Israel in particular.

He writes:

It is clear that he who prepares prior to the Sabbath will eat on the Sabbath (Avodah Zarah, 3a), and since the Haredim did not toil, they have absolutely no influence in the Land (of Israel). Those who toil and build have the influence, and they are the masters of the Land. It is, therefore, no wonder that they are in control... Now, what will the Haredim say? I do not know if they will ever be able to vindicate themselves before the heavenly court for not participating in the movement to rebuild the Land. (p. 23)

References

Further reading
Eim Habanim Semeichah: on Eretz Yisrael, Redemption, and Unity, by Harav Yisachar Shlomo Teichtal published 2000 by Kol Mevaser Publications, Israel.  Translated by Moshe Lichtman.

External links
 Eim Habanim Semeichah on HebrewBooks.org Torah database
 Chaburat Eim Habanim Semeichah—On-line study of Eim Habanim Semeichah and related topics on Yahoo! Groups.
 Daniel Reiser. Aspects in the Thought of Rabbi Yisachar Shlomo Teichtal and a Study of New Documents, Yad Vashem Studies, vol. 43:2 (2015), pp. 143–190. on Academia.edu.
The Vision of Redemption in Rabbi Yissakhar Shlomo Teichtal's Writings: Changes in his Messianic Approach During the Holocaust, by Isaac Hershkowitz; Ph.D. dissertation, Bar-Ilan University (2009).

Religious Zionism
Books about Zionism
1943 books